Bradyville is an unincorporated community in Cannon County, United States. Its ZIP code is 37026.  It is situated along Tennessee State Route 64 in a hilly area of southwestern Cannon County.

History
Bradyville was named for William Brady, a local pioneer. A post office called Bradyville has been in operation since 1837.

References

Unincorporated communities in Cannon County, Tennessee
Unincorporated communities in Tennessee